Lana Obad (born 20 May 1988) is a student at Faculty of Economics and Business at University of Zagreb who was crowned Miss Universe Croatia 2010.

Lana Obad stands 173 cm and represented her country at the Miss Universe 2010 pageant on 23 August 2010 in Las Vegas, Nevada.

References

Croatian female models
Models from Zagreb
Miss Universe 2010 contestants
Living people
1988 births
Croatian beauty pageant winners